Al-Thawra Sports City Stadium, also known as the Ali Mohsen al-Muraisi Stadium, is a multi-purpose stadium in San‘a’, Yemen. It is currently used mostly for football matches. The stadium had a capacity of 30,000 people before bombings and it opened in 1986. It is currently the home ground of the Yemen national football team.

During the Saudi Arabian-led intervention in Yemen at the Yemen War, the stadium was destroyed by a Saudi Arabian's air strike. In 2016, the stadium suffered bomb damage again.

References

External links
Altawra Sports City Stadium on footballgroundmap.com

Football venues in Yemen
Athletics (track and field) venues in Yemen
Sport in Sanaa
Yemen
Multi-purpose stadiums in Yemen